Butylthiol may refer to:

 Butanethiol (1-butylthiol)
 tert-Butylthiol (TBM)